The National Heritage Council of Namibia (NHC) is a government organization in Namibia, responsible for historic preservation. It was created through the National Heritage Act, (Act Number 27 of 2004), which is an Act of Parliament, mandated "to provide for the protection and conservation of places and objects of heritage significance and the registration of such places and objects; to establish a National Heritage Council; to establish a National Heritage Register; and to provide for incidental matters". The council is managed by Ms. Erica Ndalikokule.

The organisation is the successor to the National Monuments Council, an organisation set up under the National Monuments Act of South Africa which applied in Namibia during the period of South African rule and during the first fourteen years of independence.

In 2007, the National Heritage Register was created as the central repository authorised by the 2004 act.

Notable structures and sites

 Battle of Ohamakari, the site of a battle during the Herero and Nama genocide, located near Okakarara
 Eenhana Memorial Shrine in Eenhana
 Heroes Acre near Windhoek

Proposed sites
 Gobabis Fountain in Gobabis
 Hosea Kutako's Homestead in Omaheke Region
 Okapendje, site of several Namibian deaths in the South African Border War
 Omuhaturua site of killing of San and Ovaherero people during the genocide

See also
 National Monuments Council (South Africa and Namibia)

References

External links 
 National Heritage Council, Namibia

History of Namibia
Government of Namibia
2004 in Namibia
Namibian culture
National heritage organizations